Charles Kennon "Buck" Marrow (August 29, 1909 – November 21, 1982), was a professional baseball player who pitched in the Major Leagues in 1932 and 1937–38. He played for the Brooklyn Dodgers and Detroit Tigers.

Born in Tarboro, North Carolina, Marrow died on November 21, 1982, in Newport News, Virginia.

References

External links

1909 births
1982 deaths
Major League Baseball pitchers
Baseball players from North Carolina
Detroit Tigers players
Brooklyn Dodgers players
Davidson Wildcats baseball players
Beaumont Exporters players
Fort Smith Twins players
Toronto Maple Leafs (International League) players
Minneapolis Millers (baseball) players
Louisville Colonels (minor league) players
Milwaukee Brewers (minor league) players
Chattanooga Lookouts players
People from Tarboro, North Carolina